Working Man's Café is the third studio album by English singer-songwriter Ray Davies released on 22 October 2007 in the UK. A day earlier, on 21 October, a ten track promotional copy of the album (minus bonus tracks "Hymn for a New Age" and "The Real World") was "given away" with the Sunday Times newspaper in the UK. The album was released in the US on New West/Ammal Records on 19 February 2008.

The cafe pictured in the artwork is Lane Cafe, located within walking distance of Konk Studios.

Track listing
All tracks composed by Ray Davies
"Vietnam Cowboys"
"You're Asking Me"
"Working Man's Café"
"Morphine Song"
"In a Moment"
"Peace in Our Time"
"No One Listen"
"Imaginary Man"
"One More Time"
"The Voodoo Walk"
"Hymn for a New Age"
"The Real World"

The American CD/DVD deluxe edition, released on 19 February 2008, contains the following four bonus tracks in addition to those aforementioned:

"Angola (Wrong Side of the Law)"
"I, The Victim" (Rough Mix from the upcoming project called "Ripper")
"Vietnam Cowboys" (Demo)
"The Voodoo Walk" (Demo)

It also contains a separate DVD with a twenty-minute short film named Americana: A Work in Progress, filmed and directed by Ray Davies, featuring footage from the Storyteller tour that took place in the autumn of 2001.

Personnel
Ray Davies - lead vocals, acoustic guitar, keyboards
Patrick Buchanan - electric guitar
Ray Kennedy - additional electric guitar, percussion
Craig Young - bass
Tim Lauer - keyboards
Shannon Otis Forrest - drums
Karin Forsman, Ray Davies, Ray Kennedy - background vocals
Mick Avory - percussion on "You're Asking Me"
Nick Payne - tenor and baritone saxophone on "Morphine Song"
Mike Cotton - trumpet on "Morphine Song"
Simon Edwards - bass on "One More Time"
Martyn Baker - drums on "One More Time"
Bill Lloyd - electric guitar on "The Real World"
Technical
Rob Crane - design
Chris Clunn - photography

External links
The Official Ray Davies Website

2007 albums
Ray Davies albums
V2 Records albums
Albums produced by Ray Davies